Charles Christopher White Jr. (born August 2, 1994), better known as MoistCr1TiKaL (pronounced "moist critical") or simply Cr1TiKaL (or by the channel name penguinz0), is an American YouTuber, Twitch streamer and musician. He is best known for his commentary videos and live streams covering internet culture and video games. White's content is characterized by his monotone deep voice and deadpan comedic style. In addition, White is the co-founder and co-owner of the esports organization Moist Esports and co-founder and member of the musical duo, the Gentle Men.

As of March 2023, White's YouTube channel has gained over 7.04 billion views and over 12.4 million subscribers, averaging 151.4 million views per month on the platform; his Twitch channel has gained over 4.8 million followers and over 61 million views.

Internet career

Early years and content evolution (2006–2017) 
White started making YouTube videos in 2006, when he most often uploaded videos discussing anime, as well as AMVs and GMVs to his old channels. He created his penguinz0 YouTube channel on May 7, 2007. During this time, he streamed live on Justin.tv from late 2009 to early 2010.

In 2013, White was cited by Tubefilter as panning YouTube's new comment system, which required a Google+ account to leave comments on videos. In 2015, after eight years of anonymity, White made his Snapchat username, "big_moist", public, revealing his face. He uploaded his first video showing his face on camera on March 5, 2017. In early 2015, White began speaking about various topics, including internet drama. He drew attention from media outlets for his commentary videos, which were often of discourse about online platforms and considerably critical of YouTube's policies. In December 2016, White began co-hosting The Official Podcast with fellow Internet personalities Zealot, Huggbees, and Kaya Orsan.

Media outlets sparsely referenced White's gameplay videos; his 2015 video on Ark: Survival Evolved was referenced by The Daily Star. The Daily Dot wrote that White is known for his "sardonic commentary." In February 2016, The Guardian included his video reaction to the Fine Brothers' React World controversy in their coverage of the situation. Kotaku referenced White's 2017 video demonstrating character customization in Mass Effect: Andromeda.

Twitch live streaming and continued growth (2018–now) 
White has continued to make content discussing events in online platforms and their communities. In January 2018, White addressed YouTube, which removed his video discussing Logan Paul's suicide forest controversy. By March 2018, White's YouTube channel had two million subscribers. In May, White's video featuring a pit of 5,400 balls, which he made for his husky Tetra, went viral; the Press Association interviewed him about the video and media outlets reported it. In 2018, White began livestreaming on Twitch. In March 2020; due to COVID-19 lockdown measures, he co-hosted an online Super Smash Bros. Ultimate tournament on his Twitch channel with fellow YouTuber Alpharad.

In late 2020, White's popularity grew due to his Twitch streams about chess and Among Us (during its 2020 popularity spike) with popular streamers such as Sykkuno, Pokimane, Nigahiga, Valkyrae, Trainwreckstv, and Disguised Toast. In June, White participated in the first PogChamps chess tournament, which Chess.com hosted. He won "one of the more anticipated games" in the tournament, beating fellow Twitch streamer xQc in six moves. According to Dot Esports, the game was one of the five "biggest moments in streaming from 2020" and the clip of White's victory became one of the most-viewed in Twitch history, gaining over 1.9 million views by December 24, 2020. White won the tournament's consolation bracket. In late October, White participated in U.S. Representative Alexandria Ocasio-Cortez's Among Us live streams.

In November, White signed a contract with BroadbandTV Corp (BBTV) to become a content partner with the company. Also in November, White spoke in a YouTube video about an increase in Twitch's DMCA crackdowns. In December, White participated in a "Pokémon Week" event on Twitch in which several creators hosting streams in which they opened boxes of Pokémon cards. In January 2021, White began hosting a game show titled Hivemind with fellow streamer Ludwig Ahgren on Twitch.

On February 22, 2021, former YouTuber MaximilianMus deleted his YouTube channel after White labeled him "the worst YouTuber" in one of his videos. White was critical of Mus for maliciously raiding Twitch channels and claimed that his audience had shared child pornography via Discord servers and his subreddit. In May of that year, MaximilianMus restored his channel and accused White of slander. In October 2021, White participated in a Nickelodeon All-Star Brawl charity tournament hosted by Alpharad and Coney of Panda Global.

Other ventures 

In 2019, White and Troy McKubre of the band Solstate started a musical duo named the Gentle Men. The duo started producing music with a string of singles released that same year. In 2019, White co-founded Human Media Group, an American multi-channel network, with his friend Matt Philips. The network provides brand deals and legal teams to online content creators. On July 5, 2021, White announced the launch of a graphic novel series titled GODSLAP, which he wrote with author Stephanie Phillips and artist Ricardo Jaime, and was published by Meatier Productions. White expressed interest in the expansion of the series beyond comics, and hinted at an animated adaptation that was being produced.

On August 11, 2021, White announced a new esports organization named Moist Esports. Super Smash Bros. Ultimate player Kolawole "Kola" Aideyan became the first player to join, and won a tournament under the name "Moist Kola". On August 8, 2022, gaming organization One True King, along with White, announced the founding of technology company Starforge Systems, which focuses on building computers. The company was quickly met with backlash due to the allegedly high prices of their products, and shortly thereafter, decreased their prices by $100.

Personal life 
White was born on August 2, 1994, in Tampa, Florida. He attended Carrollwood Day School and was a member of the varsity basketball team. White had recurrent pneumothorax in his left lung, which collapsed three times before he underwent surgery in 2011. He also suffered from obsessive–compulsive disorder during his teenage years and has stated that he performed "weird rituals" as a result. White attended The University of Tampa and graduated with a bachelor's degree in human sciences with a focus on exercise physiology.

Filmography

Film

Web

Podcast

Voice roles

Bibliography

Awards and nominations

See also 
Moist Esports
List of YouTubers
List of most-followed Twitch channels

References

External links 

1994 births
American businesspeople in the online media industry
American podcasters
American YouTubers
Businesspeople from Tampa, Florida
Commentary YouTubers
English-language YouTube channels
Gaming YouTubers
Internet memes introduced in 2020
Living people
Male actors from Tampa, Florida
Musicians from Tampa, Florida
Music YouTubers
People with obsessive–compulsive disorder
Singer-songwriters from Florida
Streamer Award winners
Twitch (service) streamers
University of Tampa alumni
Video game commentators
Writers from Tampa, Florida
YouTube channels launched in 2007
YouTube podcasters
YouTube vloggers
Internet memes